The 2023 Kaduna State gubernatorial election will take place on 18 March 2023, to elect the Governor of Kaduna State, concurrent with elections to the Kaduna State House of Assembly as well as twenty-seven other gubernatorial elections and elections to all other state houses of assembly. The election—which was postponed from its original 11 March date—will be held three weeks after the presidential election and National Assembly elections. Incumbent APC Governor Nasir Ahmad el-Rufai is term-limited and cannot seek re-election to a third term.

Party primaries were scheduled for between 4 April and 9 June 2022 with the Peoples Democratic Party nominating former House of Representatives member Isa Ashiru on 25 May while the All Progressives Congress nominated Uba Sani—Senator for Kaduna Central—on 26 May. In August, Jonathan Asake—a former House of Representatives member and former Southern Kaduna Peoples Union President—won the nomination of the Labour Party in a rerun primary.

Electoral system
The Governor of Kaduna State is elected using a modified two-round system. To be elected in the first round, a candidate must receive the plurality of the vote and over 25% of the vote in at least two-thirds of state local government areas. If no candidate passes this threshold, a second round will be held between the top candidate and the next candidate to have received a plurality of votes in the highest number of local government areas.

Background
Kaduna State is a large, diverse northwestern state with a growing economy and vast natural areas but facing an underdeveloped agricultural sector and intense challenges in security as the nationwide kidnapping epidemic, bandit conflict, inter-ethnic violence, and herder–farmer clashes have all heavily affected the state.

Politically, the 2019 elections were categorized as a slight solidification of the Kaduna APC's control as el-Rufai won re-election with over 55% of the vote and the party retained its House of Assembly majority. Federally, the APC regained two of the three Senate seats it lost due to defections and won eleven of the sixteen House of Representatives seats. For the presidency, Kaduna was won by APC nominee Muhammadu Buhari with about 60% but swung slightly towards the PDP. The 2019 elections also showed the political divide between the diverse, Christian-majority Southern region and the mainly Hausa and Fulani, Muslim-majority Northern and Central regions as the former region moved towards the PDP while the latter two regions stuck with the APC.

Ahead of el-Rufai's second term, his administration stated focuses included government reform, forging a positive business environment, unity, education, and urban development. In terms of his performance, el-Rufai was praised for proper budgeting, expanding free education, a proactive response to the beginning of the COVID-19 pandemic, urban infrastructure development, and raising pensions. However, he faced criticism for alleged anti-Christian sentiment in the state government, rising insecurity and el-Rufai's irresponsible statements on it, and labour disputes along with authoritarian-esque actions including the arrest of journalists and the infiltration of Amnesty International Nigeria.

Primary elections
The primaries, along with any potential challenges to primary results, were to take place between 4 April and 3 June 2022 but the deadline was extended to 9 June. According to some candidates and community groups, an informal zoning gentlemen's agreement sets the Kaduna South Senatorial District to have the next governor as the only governor from the south did not finish his term. However, no major party zoned their nomination. Another informal convention mandated different religion tickets with one running mate being Christian while the other was Muslim; however, el-Rufai discarded this tradition in 2019 and neither party committed to a return to the tradition.

All Progressives Congress 
By early 2022, reports emerged that el-Rufai was looking to endorse a member of his core inner circle to succeed him with names like former commissioner Muhammad Sani Abdullahi, Senator Uba Sani, and Deputy Governor Hadiza Sabuwa Balarabe being floated as the major potential candidates. In early 2022, reports came out that the el-Rufai's endorsement process had culminated in Sani emerging as his pick while Abdullahi was to run to replace Sani in the Senate and Balarabe would become Sani's running mate. While both Abdullahi and Balarabe accepted the process and dropped their gubernatorial ambitions, other candidates like former House of Representatives member Sani Sha'aban objected to the endorsement process and labeled it as undemocratic and illegitimate.

In the days before the primary, disputes emerged over the delegate list as Sani's opponents—Bashir Abubakar and Sha'aban—accused el-Rufai of imposing delegates without proper congresses and called for national party intervention. However, the congress appeals committee upheld the delegate elections and labeled the exercise as "successful." Pre-primary analysis stated that although Sha'aban expected support from politicians close to his in-law President Muhammadu Buhari, it was "safe to project" Sani would win. On primary day, the three candidates contested an indirect primary that ended with Sani's wide victory after results showed him over 96% of the delegates' votes. After the votes were collated, Sani thanked delegates, el-Rufai, and his opponents in his acceptance speech but both Abubakar and Sha'aban wholeheartedly rejected the results. The weeks after the primary were dominated by the search for Sani's running mate; the first part of el Rufai's plan went well with Abdullahi winning the senatorial primary but opposition emerged to Balarabe continuing as the deputy gubernatorial nominee. Previous informal convention was against same religion tickets and the pick of Balarabe would be the second consecutive APC ticket in violation of the convention as both Sani and Balarabe are Muslim; Christian groups lobbied against another Muslim-Muslim ticket and noted that such a ticket would be untimely amid a rise in religious tension and violence. Despite the outcry, Sani picked Balarabe as his running mate on 4 July. In response, observers expressed worry over religious equality and tensions if the APC ticket won while some groups called for asked voters to reject Sani. Meanwhile, Sha'aban filed a lawsuit against Sani's nomination based on allegedly improper primary conduct; however, the case was dismissed by a Federal High Court in November 2022 and the Supreme Court in February 2023.

Nominated 
 Uba Sani: Senator for Kaduna Central (2019–present) and former aide to former President Olusegun Obasanjo
 Running mate—Hadiza Sabuwa Balarabe: Deputy Governor (2019–present)

Eliminated in primary 
 Bashir Abubakar: former Customs Service official
 Sani Sha'aban: former House of Representatives member for Zaria, 2007 ANPP gubernatorial nominee, and in-law of President Muhammadu Buhari

Withdrew 
 Muhammad Sani Abdullahi: former Commissioner for Budget and Planning (2015–2019; 2021–2022) and former Chief of Staff to el-Rufai (2019–2021)
 Abdulmalik Durunguwa: National Population Commission Commissioner (2018–present)
 Bashir Jamoh: Director-General of the Nigerian Maritime Administration and Safety Agency (2020–present)

Declined 
 Mohammad Mahmood Abubakar: Minister of Agriculture and Rural Development (2021–present), Minister of Environment (2019–2021), and former House of Assembly member
 Olumuyiwa Adekeye: el-Rufai aide
 Mukhtar Ahmed: House of Representatives member for Kaduna South (2019–present) and former el-Rufai aide
 Samuel Aruwan: Commissioner for Internal Security and Home Affairs (2019–present)
 Saude Atoyebi: el-Rufai aide
 Hadiza Sabuwa Balarabe: Deputy Governor (2019–present)
 Muhammad Hafiz Bayero: Administrator of the Kaduna Capital Territory (2021–present)
 Peter Akagu Jones: former el-Rufai aide
 Suleiman Abdu Kwari: Senator for Kaduna North (2019–present) and Commissioner for Finance (2015–2019)
 Balarabe Abbas Lawal: Secretary to the State Government (2015–present)
 Abdullahi Mukhtar Mohammed: former CEO of the National Hajj Commission and former Chairman of the Kaduna State Pilgrims Board
 Idris Othman: businessman and brother of former Senator Suleiman Othman Hunkuyi
 Muhammad Dayyabu Paki: Director-General of the Kaduna Facilities Management Agency and former Ikara Local Government Interim Management Committee Chairman
 Muhammad Bashir Saidu: Commissioner for Finance (2019–present), former Chief of Staff to el-Rufai (2016–2019), and former Commissioner for Local Government (2015–2016)
 Ja'afaru Ibrahim Sani: Commissioner for Local Government Affairs (2017–present)
 Hadiza Bala Usman: former Managing Director of the Nigerian Ports Authority (2016–2021) and co-founder of the Bring Back Our Girls campaign

Results

People's Democratic Party 

Pre-primary analysis labeled Isa Ashiru—a former MHR and the party's 2019 nominee—as the frontrunner but noted his opponents had a chance for an upset. On the primary date, one major candidate (former Senator Yusuf Datti Baba-Ahmed) withdrew while the other six candidates continued to an indirect primary that ended in Isa Ashiru emerging as the SDP nominee after results showed Ashiru winning over 56% of the delegates' votes. However, controversy rose after the primary when it was alleged that Ashiru had colluded with Kaduna PDP Chairman Felix Hyat to manipulate the delegate list in Ashiru's favour in exchange for Hyat becoming Ashiru's running mate. Despite this alleged plan, Ashiru announced former commissioner John Ayuba as his running mate in June; noting the regional balance as Ayuba is from Kaduna South while Ashiru is from Kaduna North. In July, Baba-Ahmed defected to the LP to become its vice-presidential nominee.

Nominated 
 Isa Ashiru: 2019 PDP gubernatorial nominee, former House of Representatives member for Makarfi/Kudan, and former House of Assembly member for Kudan
Running mate—John Ayuba: former Commissioner for Finance

Eliminated in primary 
 Mohammed Sani Abbas: barrister and financial consultant
 Haruna Yunusa Saeed: 2019 SDP gubernatorial nominee, 2015 APC gubernatorial candidate, and 2011 CPC gubernatorial nominee
 Shehu Sani: former Senator for Kaduna Central (2015–2019)
 Muhammad Sani Sidi: 2019 PDP gubernatorial candidate and former Director-General of the National Emergency Management Agency (2010–2017)
 Mukhtar Ramalan Yero: 2019 PDP gubernatorial candidate, former Governor (2012–2015), former Deputy Governor (2010–2012), and Commissioner of Finance (2007–2010)

Withdrew 
 Yusuf Datti Baba-Ahmed: former Senator for Kaduna North (2011–2012) and former House of Representatives member for Zaria (2003–2007) (defected after to the primary to become the LP vice presidential nominee)

Declined 
 Muhammad Sani Bello: 2019 PDP gubernatorial candidate

Results

Minor parties 

 Timothy Sherman Adamu (Action Alliance)
Running mate: Ismail Umar Abubakar
 Yusuf Jibril (Action Democratic Party)
Running mate: John Yayock Solomon
 Yahaya Musa Kallah (Action Peoples Party)
Running mate: Zipporah Samuel Bijeh
 Caleb Zagi (African Democratic Congress)
Running mate: Kabir Lawal Jibril
 Yahaya Alhassan (Allied Peoples Movement)
Running mate: Maina Maimuna Kyari
 Andrew Abui Duya (All Progressives Grand Alliance)
Running mate: Mohammed Auwal Yunusa
 Jonathan Asake (Labour Party)
Running mate: Bashir Idris Aliyu
 Suleiman Othman Hunkuyi (New Nigeria Peoples Party)
Running mate: Sani Mazawaje
 Salihu Abubakar Gambo (National Rescue Movement)
Running mate: Magaji Linda Danladi
 Hayatuddeen Lawal (People's Redemption Party)
Running mate: Ashidi Manasseh Mamman
 Adamu Abubakar Idris (Social Democratic Party)
Running mate: Grace Zagwai Sankut
 Yaya Sanin Yaya (Young Progressives Party)
Running mate: Ramson Nwoha

Campaign
As the general election campaign began in June 2022, pundits focused on the major candidates' search for running mates. Due to geopolitical dynamics and the state's religious diversity, informal convention states that a nominee from Kaduna Central or North districts should pick a running mate from Southern Kaduna and vice versa along with balancing the ticket religiously by picking a ticket with one Muslim and one Christian. As both the PDP and the APC nominated Muslims from the Central and North districts, they were expected to select a southern Christian running mate. While Ashiru followed the convention by picking John Ayuba—a Christian from Zangon Kataf LGA, the APC again violated the religious part of the convention by renominating incumbent Deputy Governor Hadiza Sabuwa Balarabe—a Muslim from Sanga LGA. As the national APC also violated the anti-same religion ticket convention by nominating the Bola Tinubu-Kashim Shettima slate and el-Rufai faced constant criticism of his handling of inter-religious tensions, analysts noted the likely significance of religious identity in the Kaduna election. However, Ayuba's selection was not without controversy either as youth groups lamented his age of 68.

As the general election campaign began in July and August, reporting also pointed out other potential factors like the el-Rufai administration's urban renewal projects, APC members aggrieved by the contentious party primary, Sani's senate performance, expected PDP dominance in Southern Kaduna, and PDP internal disputes along with the more prominent minor party nominees—Jonathan Asake (LP), Suleiman Othman Hunkuyi (NNPP), and Hayatuddeen Lawal Makarfi (PRP). Further analysis by November surmised that the two strongest minor party nominees—Asake and Othman Hunkuyi—could split the formerly PDP base, potentially allowing Sani to win with a plurality.

With the election nearing, BBC Hausa organized a debate on 18 January 2023 and invited Sani, Asake, Othman Hunkuyi, and Ashiru to participate. While Asake did not attend, the other three had a heated debate on topics ranging from agriculture to security. In February, focus mainly switched to the presidential election on 25 February. In the election, Kaduna State voted for Atiku Abubakar (PDP); Abubakar won the state with 40.8% of the vote to defeat Bola Tinubu (APC) at 29.4%, Peter Obi (LP) at 21.7%, and Rabiu Kwankwaso (NNPP) at 6.8%. Considered a slight surprise, the result led to increased focus on the gubernatorial race due to the significant margin of victory for Abubakar and PDP success in the state's National Assembly elections. Gubernatorial campaign analysis from after the presidential election noted shock from APC figures that pushed the party to call on Islamic clerics to market voting for its Muslim-Muslim ticket as a "religious obligation" while other pundits emphasized that Asake's path to victory came from sweeping Christian voters if the Muslim voters split between Sani and Ashiru. At the same time, other observers like Jaafar Jaafar doubted Asake's chances of victory and reiterated that Asake's strength among formerly PDP supporting southern communities could allow Sani to win by splitting the old PDP base.

Election debates

Projections

Conduct

Electoral timetable

Pre-election
Due to widespread insecurity in the state, civil society groups raised concern about the safe conduct of the election in heavily-insecure areas.

General election

Results

By senatorial district 
The results of the election by senatorial district.

By federal constituency
The results of the election by federal constituency.

By local government area 
The results of the election by local government area.

See also 
 2023 Nigerian general election
 2023 Nigerian gubernatorial elections

Notes

References 

Kaduna State gubernatorial election
2023
2023 Kaduna State elections
Kaduna